Alan Dale (born Aldo Sigismondi; July 9, 1925 – April 20, 2002) was an American singer of traditional popular and rock and roll music.

Early life
Aldo Sigismondi was born in Brooklyn, New York. His father, Aristide Sigismondi, immigrated to the United States from Abruzzi, Italy, in 1904 at the age of 21, and became a comedian in Italian language theater, with a radio program of his own. His mother, Agata "Kate" Sigismondi, was born in Messina, Sicily, and was 15 years younger than Aristide.

At the age of nine, Aldo got his first chance to perform publicly when his father was running short on his program and called on Aldo to sing. Though Aldo fainted immediately upon completing his song, he was good enough that he became a regular on his father's program.

Dale's intention was originally not to be a singer, but to go into journalism. However, he quit school after an argument with a teacher and ended up going from one job to another, until one day in 1943 he and a friend passed by a casino in Coney Island and the friend suggested he try out for a singing job. He was told to come back in the evening, and when he came back prepared to sing two songs, was called back for seven encores. He was immediately hired. In 1944, he joined the Carmen Cavallaro Orchestra as featured vocalist, and at Cavallaro's insistence got a new name. The name was taken from Alan-a-Dale. In 1944 and 1945, Dale sang for George Paxton's Orchestra and became increasingly popular on the East Coast performing at the Roseland Ballroom in New York and recording for Majestic Records.

Musical career
In 1947 he was encouraged by Bob Thiele, a record producer, to sign up as a solo artist with Signature Records. He premiered as a soloist on Columbia records in a December 1947 film short featuring the Elliot Lawrence Orchestra. The next year he got his own television show, The Alan Dale Show, on the DuMont Television Network. In 1950, it went to CBS.

In the early 1950s, he shuttled around from one record label to another, going from Columbia to Decca before settling with Coral, the label on which he had his major hits: "(The Gang that Sang) Heart of My Heart" (together with Johnny Desmond and Don Cornell), which reached #10 on Billboard in 1953, a vocal version of "Cherry Pink and Apple Blossom White" which reached #14 in 1955, and "Sweet and Gentle", which also charted in 1955, at #10. The last two recordings sold over one million copies each, and were awarded gold discs.

Also in 1955. the singles "I'm Sincere" (the flip of "Cherry Pink") and "Rockin The Cha-Cha" reached the Music Vendor top 40.

He became a friend of Alan Freed, and as a result got a chance to play a role as a rock and roll singer in the 1956 film, Don't Knock the Rock. In this movie, he played alongside Freed, Bill Haley & His Comets, Little Richard, and The Treniers. He sang the title song, which he also recorded as a single.

In 1957 he resumed his shuttling from one record label to another, going to ABC, MGM, and United Artists. In 1958, while in a nightclub in New York, Dale was attacked, suffering cuts and a serious hand injury when he crashed into a plate glass window after having fallen down a set of stairs. Dale recovered from his injuries, but the assailant who knocked him down the stairs was never identified.

Career decline and death
At the end of the 1950s, Dale found television hosts such as Ed Sullivan were refusing to have him on their shows, causing his career to go into decline. This was not helped by his authorship of a 1965 autobiography, The Spider and the Marionettes, in which he listed names of people who were trying to affect his career adversely, with descriptions of their activities toward this end. Despite this, Dale was able to maintain a lower-profile version of his singing career over the ensuing decades, performing at nightclubs, dinner theaters and concert appearances.

He died in New York in 2002, at the age of 76.

References

External links
Alan Dale biography
 Alan Dale recordings at the Discography of American Historical Recordings.
Alan Dale, Prince of Baritones

1925 births
2002 deaths
Musicians from Brooklyn
Burials at Green-Wood Cemetery
American people of Italian descent
Jubilee Records artists
20th-century American singers
20th-century American male singers